Pedro Juan Caballero may refer to:

Pedro Juan Caballero (politician), leader of Paraguayan independence
Pedro Juan Caballero, Paraguay, a city